San Quentin is a 1937 Warner Bros. drama film directed by Lloyd Bacon and starring Pat O'Brien, Humphrey Bogart, and Ann Sheridan. It was shot on location at San Quentin State Prison.

Plot 
Ex-Army officer Steve Jameson (Pat O' Brien), the chief guard at San Quentin State Prison, meets May Kennedy (Ann Sheridan), who works as a singer in a San Francisco night club. Joe "Red" Kennedy (Humphrey Bogart), her brother, who is on the run from the police, is arrested at the nightclub when he comes to see his sister.

Red arrives in San Quentin a few days later with another new inmate, hardened criminal "Sailor Boy" Hansen (Joe Sawyer). After a fight with Sailor in the courtyard on his first day, Jameson punishes him. May begins a romantic relationship with Jameson, and soon finds out what he couldn't tell her before: He is the yard captain of the prison, who is in charge of the prisoners.

Jameson institutes a merit system intended to separate the hapless lawbreakers from the hardened criminals. Joe is then selected by Jameson to work outside of the prison in a road camp, constructing a new road, as a step in his rehabilitation. Lieutenant Druggin (Barton MacLane), the former chief guard, resents Jameson's methods, and surreptitiously assigns Hansen also to the road camp. Hansen then makes a plan to break out of prison. At first Red refuses to join him, but changes his mind when he learns that Jameson is dating his sister.

Hansen's girlfriend (Veda Ann Borg) arrives in a car at the site where the inmates are working and asks for help with a flat tire. Hansen volunteers to change the tire, and retrieves two guns that were hidden in the tool box. He and Red take a guard hostage and flee. After a wild car pursuit, Hansen's car crashes and he dies. Red survives the crash and escapes. He makes it to May's flat, but Jameson is already there. After a short argument, Red shoots at Jameson who is slightly injured. Red flees and is shot by a police patrol, but he has enough strength to get back to the prison, where he dies in front of the gates.

Cast

 Pat O'Brien as Capt. Stephen Jameson
 Humphrey Bogart as Joe 'Red' Kennedy
 Ann Sheridan as May Kennedy
 Barton MacLane as Lt. Druggin
 Joe Sawyer as 'Sailor Boy' Hansen (credited as Joseph Sawyer)
 Veda Ann Borg as Helen
 Archie Robbins as Mickey Callahan (credited as James Robbins)
 Joe King as Warden Taylor (credited as Joseph King)
 Gordon Oliver as Captain
 Garry Owen as Dopey
 Marc Lawrence as Venetti
 Emmett Vogan as Lieutenant
 William Pawley as Convict
 Al Hill as Convict
 Max Wagner as Prison Runner
 George Lloyd as Convict
 Ernie Adams as Fink
 Pat Flaherty as Cop clearing May (uncredited)
 Edward Keane as 2nd Detective (uncredited)

References

External links
 
 
 
 

1937 films
1937 crime drama films
1930s prison films
American black-and-white films
American crime drama films
American prison drama films
1930s English-language films
Films directed by Lloyd Bacon
Films produced by Hal B. Wallis
Films produced by Samuel Bischoff
Films set in San Quentin State Prison
Films shot in San Quentin, California
Warner Bros. films
1930s American films